Luiz de Araújo Guimarães Neto (born 2 June 1996), known as Luiz Araújo, is a Brazilian professional footballer who plays as a winger for Major League Soccer club Atlanta United.

Career

São Paulo
Born in Taquaritinga, São Paulo, Araújo began his career with Mirassol as a youth, before being promoted to the first team in January 2013. Before he could make his debut for Mirassol, Araújo joined São Paulo, returning to youth football.

Loan to Novorizontino
On 26 February 2016, after finishing as the top scorer in the U-20 Copa Libertadores, Araújo was loaned to Novorizontino until the end of the Campeonato Paulista in April. He made his professional debut for the club on 19 March, coming on as a second-half substitute in a 1–1 home draw against XV de Piracicaba.

Return to São Paulo
Following the Campeonato Paulista season, Araújo returned to São Paulo and immediately joined the first team. He made his senior and Série A debut for the club on 5 June 2016 against Cruzeiro, replacing Ytalo in a 1–0 victory. He then made his debut in the Copa Libertadores on 13 July 2016 against Atlético Nacional in the second leg of the semifinals, coming on as a substitute in the 2–1 defeat. On 5 November, Araújo scored his first professional goal, a late second half stoppage time strike to help  São Paulo win 4–0 over Corinthians.

Araújo finished his debut season with São Paulo on 11 December against Santa Cruz, scoring the fifth goal in a 5–0 home victory.

On 15 February 2017, Araújo scored his first two goals of the season, earning a brace in a 3–1 away victory against Santos in the Campeonato Paulista. He played his final match for São Paulo on 4 June 2017, a 1–0 defeat against Ponte Preta.

Lille
On 14 June 2017, Araújo signed for French Ligue 1 club Lille, for a reported €10.5 million. He made his debut for the club in their opening match on 6 August against Nantes, starting for Marcelo Bielsa's side in a 3–0 victory. Araújo then scored his first goal for Lille on 14 October in a 2–2 home draw against Troyes. His goal was a 12th-minute equalizer. Araújo completed his first season at Lille with 6 goals in 36 matches as the club barely managed to survive relegation from the first division.

During the 2018–19 season, Araújo dropped to just six starts in the league but played in 27 matches overall in Ligue 1, contributing three goals, as Lille finished 2nd behind Paris Saint-Germain.

The next season, 2019–20, Araújo continued as a regular substitute for Lille but played more matches overall. He scored his first goal of the campaign on 13 September 2019 against Angers in a 2–1 home victory. Araújo then made his European debut for Lille in the UEFA Champions League on 17 September against Ajax. He came on as a 63rd-minute substitute in the 3–0 defeat. Araújo would go on to play in all six matches, earning three starts, for Lille as they were knocked out after the group stage, finishing last.

Following the 2019–20 season, which was cancelled due to the COVID-19 pandemic, Araújo began the 2020–21 season as an 83rd-minute substitute against Rennais in a 1–1 draw. He then scored two goals in two matches on 13 September and 20 September against Metz and Marseille. His goal against Metz was the only goal in the 1–0 victory and the opening goal in the 1–1 draw against Marseille. Araújo made his debut for Lille in their opening match of the UEFA Europa League group stage on 22 October 2020 in a 4–1 away victory against Sparta Prague. Lille would go on to finish 2nd in their group and qualify for the knock-outs. On 3 December, he suffered an injury during the club's home match against Sparta Prague, leaving Araújo out until 2021.

Araújo returned to the pitch for Lille on 17 January 2021 against Reims. On 16 April, Araújo scored the equalizer for Lille in a 1–1 draw against Montpellier. The draw helped keep Lille six points ahead of Paris Saint-Germain for the league title. The title was soon secured during the final match on 23 May against Angers, with Lille winning by just a point over Paris Saint-Germain. Araújo came on as an 82nd-minute substitute during the 2–1 away victory.

On 1 August 2021, Araújo played his final match for Lille, in the Trophée des Champions against Paris Saint-Germain. He started and played 85 minutes as Lille secured a 1–0 victory at Bloomfield Stadium in Tel Aviv.

Atlanta United
On 6 August 2021, Araújo signed with Major League Soccer side Atlanta United as a designated player. He made his debut for the club on 18 August against Toronto FC, playing 67 minutes in a 1–0 victory at Mercedes-Benz Stadium.

Araújo scored his first goal for the club on 15 September, converting after getting the ball 50 yards from goal, spinning past his defender, running and curling his shot into the left corner in the 5th minute, as Atlanta United won 4–0 at home.

Career statistics

Honours
Lille
Ligue 1: 2020–21
Trophée des Champions: 2021

References

External links
 Profile at Atlanta United

1996 births
Living people
Footballers from São Paulo (state)
Brazilian footballers
Brazilian expatriate footballers
Association football forwards
Campeonato Brasileiro Série A players
Ligue 1 players
Major League Soccer players
Mirassol Futebol Clube players
São Paulo FC players
Lille OSC players
Atlanta United FC players
Designated Players (MLS)
Expatriate footballers in France
Expatriate soccer players in the United States
Brazilian expatriate sportspeople in the United States
People from Taquaritinga